The airbase at Chiran, Minamikyūshū, on the Satsuma Peninsula of Kagoshima, Japan, served as the departure point for hundreds of Special Attack or kamikaze sorties launched in the final months of World War II.

Airbase
The Imperial Japanese Army airbase at Chiran, Kagoshima, with its two runways, was the principal base of the kamikaze pilots during the Battle of Okinawa. Of the 1,036 army aviators who died in these attacks, 439 were from Chiran. Of the total number, 335 were classed as "young boy pilots" (少年飛行兵).

Peace Museum

In 1975 a museum was built to commemorate the lives of the pilots and document their "patriotic efforts for peace". Enlarged in 1985, exhibits include four planes: a Nakajima Ki-43 Hayabusa, a 1943 Kawasaki Ki-61 Hien, a 1944 Nakajima Ki-84 Hayate, and a Mitsubishi Zero recovered from the seabed in 1980.  On a personal level, the exhibit includes letters, poems, essays, testaments, and other artefacts; as well as photographs of the 1,036 pilots, arranged in the order in which they died.  There is also the grand piano on which two of the pilots played the Moonlight Sonata the night before their final mission.

Other monuments
The  is a temple dedicated to the "Special Attack Goddess of Mercy". The image enshrined within is a 1.8m replica statue of the Yumechigai Kannon (夢違観音 Dream-Changing Kannon), a National Treasure at Hōryū-ji. The names of the kamikaze pilots are written on paper within her womb. It was erected in 1955 thanks to donations collected by Tome Torihama, who ran the Tomiya Inn frequented by the pilots, and who sought to redeem their memory after the war. Stone lanterns dedicated to the pilots line the approach to the museum.

Anecdotes

 Second Lieutenant Fujio Wakamatsu wrote: "Mother, I have nothing to say. In my last moment, and my first act of filial piety, I will smile and conquer. With dry eyes and knowing I have done well. Please offer some rice dumplings at our Buddhist mortuary tablet."
 Pilot Hayashi Ichizo wrote in his diary: "I will do a splendid job sinking an enemy aircraft carrier ... I read the Bible every day ... I will sing a hymn as I dive on an enemy vessel."
 Major Hajime Fuji, a training instructor, presented his petition to serve as a kamikaze pilot written in blood; his wife drowned herself and their children so that he should have no conflicting ties.
 After the war, "Two or three American soldiers jumped up on the planes and kicked them with their military boots. They ridiculed the planes with the following scornful words, 'Look! So those kamikaze fellows came against us with these piddling worn-out planes. Did they think they could win with these toys? How stupid!'"

Film
The Firefly (ホタル Hotaru): popular Japanese film of 2001, directed by Yasuo Furuhata and centered around the character of Tome Torihama, who ran the Tomiya Inn in Chiran and treated the young kamikaze pilots as if they were her own sons.

I go to die for you (俺は、君のためにこそ死ににいく Ore wa, kimi no tame ni koso shini ni iku): 2007 film with screenplay by Tokyo Governor Shintaro Ishihara, based on his conversations with Tome Torihama, who died in 1992.

Reception
On 15 August each year, the anniversary of the date on which Emperor Shōwa announced the Japanese surrender, right-wing groups drive through Chiran in trucks blaring nationalist messages and songs. Over the rest of the year, up to a million visitors come to pay tribute to the fallen.

See also
  Bansei Tokkō Peace Museum
  Japanese nationalism
  Japanese militarism
  Japanese Special Attack Units
  Suicide attack
  Cornerstone of Peace

References

Further reading

External links

 Chiran Peace Museum for Kamikaze Pilots
 Who became kamikaze pilots, and how did they feel towards their suicide mission? (IB essay published by The Concord Review, with select bibliography)
 Chiran Peace Museum for Kamikaze Pilots - article on Kamikaze Images web site

Japan in World War II
World War II memorials in Japan
Monuments and memorials in Japan
World War II museums in Japan
Peace museums
Museums in Kagoshima Prefecture
Kamikaze